Carpathian Ruthenia was a region in the easternmost part of Czechoslovakia (Subcarpathian Ruthenia, or Transcarpathia) that became an autonomous region within that country in September 1938. It declared its independence as the "Republic of Carpatho-Ukraine” in 15 March 1939, however being occupied and annexed by Hungary the same day. In total between 1939 and 1944 80,000 Carpathian Ukrainians perished.

Independence and subsequent annexation  
In November 1938, under the First Vienna Award, which resulted from the Munich Agreement, Nazi Germany and Fascist Italy prevailed on the Second Czechoslovak Republic to cede the southern third of Slovakia and southern Carpathian Ruthenia to the Kingdom of Hungary.

Between 14 March and 15 March 1939, the Slovak Republic declared its independence while Nazi Germany occupied Bohemia and Moravia creating the Protectorate of Bohemia and Moravia. On 15 March, Carpatho-Ukraine declared its independence as the Republic of Carpatho-Ukraine, with the Reverend Avhustyn Voloshyn as head of state. Hungary immediately occupied and annexed the new republic. The remnants of the Czechoslovak Army abandoned the newly-formed republic, and Carpatho-Ukraine tried to defend itself by local self-defence groups, organised by the Organization of Ukrainian Nationalists as Carpathian Sich. On 18 March, resistance to the invasion ended.

On 23 March, Hungary annexed further parts of eastern Slovakia west of Carpatho-Rus. The Hungarian invasion was followed by a few weeks of terror in which more than 27,000 people were shot dead without trial and investigation.  Over 75,000 Ukrainians decided to seek asylum in the Soviet Union, almost 60,000 of whom died in gulag prison camps. The territory covered by the Governorate of Subcarpathia was divided into three, the administrative branch offices of Ung (Ungi közigazgatási kirendeltség), Bereg (Beregi közigazgatási kirendeltség) and Máramaros (Máramarosi közigazgatási kirendeltség), having Hungarian and the Rusyn language as official languages.

Persecution of the Jewish population 
Beginning in 1939, the Jewish laws passed in Hungary were extended to the newly-annexed territories, including the rest of Carpathian Ruthenia. Then in the summer of 1941, Hungarian authorities deported about 18,000 Jews from Carpathian Ruthenia to the Galician area of the occupied Ukraine under the guise of expelling alien refugees, but in practice most of those expelled were from families that had lived in the region for the previous 50–100 years, but their legal identification was problematic because of the numerous change of status quo. Also, the laws and regulations did not help them confirm their former Hungarian citizenship. Later, most of the deportees were handed over to German Einsatzgruppen units at Kaminets Podolsk and machine-gunned over a three-day period in August 1941. Hungarian authorities conscripted Jewish men of working age into slave labor gangs in which a high proportion perished.

In March 1944, Operation Margarethe had German forces overthrow the Hungarian government and install Döme Sztójay as prime minister. In April 1944, 17 main ghettos were set up in cities in Ruthenia. 144,000 Jews were rounded up and held there. Starting on May 15, 1944 Jews were taken out of these sites to Auschwitz every day until the last deportation on June 7, 1944. By June 1944, nearly all the Jews from ghettos of Carpathian Ruthenia had been exterminated, together with other Hungarian Jews. Of more than 100,000 Jews from Carpathian Ruthenia, around 90,000 were murdered.

Transcarpathian Ukraine 

In October 1944, the German and Hungarian forces occupying Carpathian Ruthenia were expelled by the Soviets. With the assistance of the Soviet military administration, the territory was temporarily organised as an independent transitional state, namely , and it remained as such until the territorial dispute between Czechoslovakia and the Soviet Union was settled in 1946.

Territorial dispute 
A Czechoslovak delegation under František Němec was dispatched to the area which was to mobilize the liberated local population to form a Czechoslovak army and to prepare for elections in cooperation with recently established national committees. However, loyalty to a Czechoslovak state was tenuous in Carpathian Ruthenia. The Czechoslovak government-in-exile led by President Edvard Beneš issued a proclamation in April 1944 excluding from political participation former collaborationist Hungarians, Germans, and the Russophile Ruthenian followers of Andrej Brody and the Fencik Party (who had collaborated with the Hungarians). This amounted to approximately one-third of the population. Another one-third was communist, leaving one-third of the population presumably sympathetic to the Czechoslovak Republic.

Upon arrival in the territory, the Czechoslovak delegation set up headquarters in Khust and on 30 October issued a mobilization proclamation. Soviet military forces prevented both the printing and the posting of the Czechoslovak proclamation and proceeded instead to organize the local population. Protests from Beneš's government-in-exile went unheeded. Soviet activities led much of the local population to believe that Soviet annexation was imminent. The Czechoslovak delegation was also prevented from establishing a cooperative relationship with the local national committees promoted by the Soviets.

On 19 November, the communists, meeting in Mukachevo, issued a resolution requesting separation of the territory and the incorporation into the Ukrainian Soviet Socialist Republic. On November 26, the Congress of National Committees unanimously accepted the resolution of the communists. The Congress elected the National Council and instructed that a delegation be sent to Moscow to discuss union. The Czechoslovak delegation was asked to leave the area.

Negotiations between the Czechoslovak government and Moscow ensued. Both Czech and Slovak communists encouraged Beneš to resign on the territory. The Soviet Union agreed to postpone annexation until the postwar period to avoid compromising Beneš's policy based on the pre-Munich frontiers.

After World War II, in June 1945, Czechoslovakia and the Soviet Union signed a treaty ceding Carpathian-Ruthenia to the Soviets. The inhabitants - Czechs, Slovaks and Rusyns - were given the choice of Czechoslovak or Soviet citizenship. In 1946, the area became part of the Ukrainian Soviet Socialist Republic, as the Zakarpattia Oblast ('Transcarpathian Oblast').

Impact on Hungarian population 

The end of the war was a cataclysm for the ethnic Hungarian population of the area: 10,000 fled before the arrival of Soviet forces. Many of the remaining adult men (25,000) were deported to the Soviet Union; about 30% of them died in Soviet gulags. As a result of war losses, emigration and extermination of Hungarian Jews, the Hungarian-speaking population of Carpathian Ruthenia decreased from 161,000 in 1941 (Hungarian census) to 66,000 in 1947 (Soviet census); the low 1947 number is doubtless in part a result of Hungarians' fear to declare their true nationality.

See also 

 Bojko
 History of the Jews in Carpathian Ruthenia
 History of Ukraine
 Lemko
 Places inhabited by Rusyns
 Rusyns
 Ruthenians
 Ruthenians and Ukrainians in Czechoslovakia (1918–1938)
 West Ukrainian People's Republic

References

External links 
 A transport of Jews from Carpathian Ruthenia is taken off the trains and assembled on the ramp at Auschwitz-Birkenau
 Carpathian Ruthenia before World War II
 The Carpatho-Rusyn Knowledge Base
 The Tragic Tale of Sub-Carpathian Ruthenia (Podkarpatska Rus')

Eastern European theatre of World War II
History of Carpathian Ruthenia
Carpathian Ruthenia
Carpathian Ruthenia
Carpathian Ruthenia
Carpathian Ruthenia
Politics of World War II
Geographic history of Slovakia
1938